Kena is a village in Vilnius district municipality, Lithuania. It is located on the state border with Belarus and has railway customs for all passenger trains from/to Belarus and Russia, including transit trains to Kaliningrad Oblast. According to the census of 2001, Kena had 418 residents. The figure shrank to 369 in 2021. Nearby Pakenė village had 204 inhabitants.

References

Villages in Vilnius County
Vilensky Uyezd
Wilno Voivodeship (1926–1939)
Vilnius District Municipality